Wang Ye may refer to:

Wang Ye (Three Kingdoms), Chinese official of the Three Kingdoms period and Jin dynasty
Wang Ye worship, Taiwanese folk religion